The 2020–21 Servette FC season was the club's 131st season in existence and the second consecutive season in the top flight of Swiss football. In addition to the domestic league, Servette participated in this season's editions of the Swiss Cup and the UEFA Europa League. The season covered the period from 20 September 2020 to 30 June 2021.

Season overview
On Monday 31 August 2020 the Swiss Football League (SFL) published the schedule for the Raiffeisen Super League 2020–21. Servette start the new season on Sunday 20 September with an away game against Lausanne-Sport. In a first step, the SFL published the schedule for the first 18 rounds, but only fixed times for the first nine rounds. The final schedule with the further 18 games in the second half of the season will follow by the end of the year.

Players

First-team squad

Out on loan

Pre-season and friendlies

Competitions

Overview

Swiss Super League

League table

Results summary

Results by round

Matches

Swiss Cup

UEFA Europa League

Statistics

Goalscorers

References

External links

Servette FC seasons
Servette
Servette